Shuanghedong, is the longest cave in China, in Asia, and the 5th longest in the world in 2020.

It is located near the town of Wenquan in Suiyang County, Guizhou Province.

This gypsum and dolomite cave has carbon dioxide levels of approximately 400ppm, with a constant temperature of about 13 degrees Celsius year round.

The cave contains numerous waterfalls, and at least three underground rivers, some of which contain cave shrimp, and fish weighing several pounds. Also found, have been tadpoles, frogs, salamanders, insects, spiders, bats, leeches, blind fish, and mushrooms.

Since 1987, at least 20 expeditions from France and Japan have explored the cave.

Entrances
响水洞  Xiangshuidong
大风洞  Dafengdong
小龙洞  Xiaolongdong
山王洞  Shanwangdong
山王洞2  Shanwangdong2
阴河洞  Yinhedong
下洞  Xiadong
皮硝洞  Pixiaodong
麻黄洞  Mahuangdong
衫林洞  Shanlindong (east)
小水洞  Xiaoshuidong
何教洞  Hejiaodong
双河水洞  Shuangheshuidong
衫林洞  Shanlindong (west)
衫林洞2  Shanlindong2 (west)
石膏洞  Shigaodong (east)
熊华塘洞  Xionghuatangdong
红罩子洞  Hongzhaozidong
团堆窝水洞  Tuanduiwoshuidong
罗教洞  Luojiaodong
罗教洞二口 Luojiaodongerkou
铜鼓皮硝洞  Tonggupixiaodong
石膏洞  Shigaodong (west)
洞天坑  Dongtiankeng
上洞  Shangdong
龙潭子水洞  Longtanzishuidong
龙潭子水洞  Longtanzishuidong
文家洞  Wenjiadong
曾教洞  Zengjiaodong
黄家弯洞  Huangjiawandong
黄家弯大风洞  Huangjiawandafengdong
老硝洞 Laoxiaodong
黄瓜头洞  Huangguatoudong
大土洞  Datudong
大庆消坑洞  Daqingxiaokengdong 
大屋基大风洞  Dawujidafengdong 
二羊花沟半坡大风洞 Eryanghuagoubanpodafengdong
辛家湾凉风洞  Xinjiawanliangfengdong
石萌子特别大风洞  Shimengzitebiedafengdong
大土田角大风洞 Datutianjiaodafengdong
大土田角大风洞2 Datutianjiaodafengdong2
洞堡垭口洞 Dongbaoyakou
消坑凼大风洞  Xiaokengdangdafengdong
青岗林风洞 Qingganglinfengdong
消坑凼大风洞2 Xiaokengdangdafengdong2
瓦厂堡洞 Wachangbaodong
大田湾大消坑 Datianwandaxiaokeng
大田塘大风洞 Dàtiántángdàfēngdòng
酸枣洞 Suanzaodong
酸枣洞 2 Suanzaodong 2
酸枣洞 3 Suanzaodong 3
猎熊消坑 Liexiongxiaokeng
桃子树弯小坑 Taozishuwanxiaokeng
水洞 Shuidong (Chenghuatang)
堆窝洞 Duiwodong

See also
List of caves in China
List of longest caves

References

External links
Images

Caves of Guizhou
Gypsum caves
Karst formations of China
Archaeological sites in China
Tourist attractions in Guizhou